Barbara Greenhouse Lane (born 1941) is an art historian, and chair of the art department in the graduate studies and research program at Queens College, City University of New York. She is a scholar of the Northern Renaissance, early Netherlandish painting, and medieval art.

Education 
Lane received her doctorate in 1970 from the University of Pennsylvania. She taught at the University of Maryland and at Rutgers University during the 70s. Lane has been at Queens College since 1979, and in the graduate program since 2000. She has chaired panels at four annual meetings of the College Art Association.

Career 
Lane has performed extensive research on Hans Memling; she was awarded grants from the National Endowment for the Humanities in 1987 and 1990 in order to further her work. Her paper "The Patron and the Pirate: The Mystery of Memling's Gdańsk Last Judgment" was published in Art Bulletin in 1991. On October 26, 2005 she delivered a lecture  entitled "Memling’s Influence on Italian Portraiture from Leonardo to Raphael" at the Frick Museum.

Selected works
1978. "Rogier's Saint John and Miraflores Altarpieces Reconsidered." Art Bulletin, Vol. 60, No. 4, p. 655–672
1984. The Altar and the Altarpiece: Sacramental Themes in Early Netherlandish Painting. New York: Icon Editions. 
1988. "Sacred versus profane in early Netherlandish Painting." Simiolus: Netherlands Quarterly for the History of Art, Vol. 18, No. 3, p. 106–115
1989. "Requiem aeternam dona eis: The Beaune Last Judgment and the Mass of the Dead." Simiolus: Netherlands Quarterly for the History of Art, Vol 19, No. 3, p. 167–180
1991. "The Patron and the Pirate: The Mystery of Memling's Gdańsk Last Judgment." Art Bulletin, Vol. 73, No. 4, p. 623–640

References

American art historians
Queens College, City University of New York faculty
Living people
American women historians
University of Pennsylvania alumni
Rutgers University faculty
1941 births
Women art historians
21st-century American women